Kianna Marie Alarid is the lead singer and co-writer of Yes You Are and singer and bass guitarist for the band Tilly and the Wall from Omaha, Nebraska. She was formerly in a band called Magic Kiss with members of Park Ave. and The Faint, and before that, a hardcore band called Project 356.

She performed vocals on the song, "The Absence of God" from More Adventurous with Rilo Kiley.

Kianna co-wrote and sings on Tiësto's song "You Are My Diamond" on his album Kaleidoscope released on October 6, 2009.

Kianna also sings on She & Him's 2010 song, "In the Sun" with fellow Tilly member, Neely Jenkins.

Album appearances
Son, Ambulance - Someone Else's Déjà Vu (2008, Saddle Creek Records)
Tiësto - Kaleidoscope (2009, Ultra Records)
She & Him - Vol. II (2010, Merge Records)
Jenny Lewis - Acid Tongue (2009, Team Love Records)

See also
Derek Pressnall
Jamie Pressnall
Neely Jenkins
Nick White

Footnotes

External links
Tilly and the Wall official website
Team Love Records

1978 births
Living people
Musicians from Omaha, Nebraska
Team Love Records artists
Women bass guitarists
American indie pop musicians
Tilly and the Wall members
21st-century American women singers
21st-century American singers
21st-century American bass guitarists